Population: 2 is a 2012 American film directed by Gil Luna. The film was made entirely in Oregon with an all-Oregon cast and crew. It is recognized as having utilized several historic sites, one of which, the Fairview Training Center, no longer exists in its full form, having been demolished between 2011 and 2016.

Premise
Set against the backdrop of a post-apocalyptic Earth, Population 2 is about Lilith who wanders the remains of civilization every day, scavenging what she can from the deserted refuse of what was once a bustling city.

Cast
Jon Ashley Hall as Simon Prime
Shelly Lipkin as Vincent Velo
Sibyl Lazzara as Kennedy
Jacqueline Gault as Doctor Bannon
Meredith Adelaide as Face of Pandora (as Meredith Williams)

External links

2012 films
2010s science fiction drama films
American science fiction drama films
Films shot in Oregon
American post-apocalyptic films
2010s English-language films
2010s American films